Top Shotta is a 2020 album by NLE Choppa.

Top Shotta may also refer to:

 "Top Shotta", a 1999 compilation album by Lord Kossity
 "Top Shotta", a song by Pop Smoke from the 2020 album Faith

See also
 "Top Shotter", a song by DMX, Sean Paul and Mr. Vegas from the 1998 soundtrack album Belly